

Karl-Lothar Schulz (30 April 1907 – 26 September 1972) was a German paratroop general of Nazi Germany during World War II. He was a recipient of the Knight's Cross of the Iron Cross with Oak Leaves and Swords.

Awards
 Iron Cross (1939) 2nd Class (12 May 1940) & 1st Class (12 May 1940)
 German Cross in Gold on 26 February 1942 as Major in the III./Fallschirmjäger-Regiment 1
 Knight's Cross of the Iron Cross with Oak Leaves and Swords
 Knight' Cross on 24 May 1940 as Hauptmann and commander of the III./Fallschirmjäger-Regiment 1
 459th Oak Leaves on 20 April 1944 as Oberst and commander of the Fallschirmjäger-Regiment 1
 112th Swords on 18 November 1944 as Oberst and leader of the 1. Fallschirmjäger-Division

References
Citations

Bibliography

 
 
 

1907 births
1972 deaths
Military personnel from Königsberg
Fallschirmjäger of World War II
Luftwaffe World War II generals
Recipients of the Gold German Cross
Recipients of the Knight's Cross of the Iron Cross with Oak Leaves and Swords
Major generals of the Luftwaffe